The Kimberley rockhole frog (Litoria aurifera) is a species of small treefrog that is endemic to Western Australia. The species epithet aurifera (‘gold-bearing’) refers to the colouring of the tadpoles.

History
The species was described in 2010 following the discovery by botanists Matt and Russell Barrett of its distinctive tadpoles in shallow water near the Prince Regent River in the tropical Kimberley region of north-west Australia.

Description
The species is similar in appearance to the common rockhole frog (Litoria meiriana). It grows up to 22 mm long, and has small limbs with fully webbed toes. The tadpoles have black bodies with gold patches on the snout and back. The metamorphs are about 11 mm long.

Distribution and habitat
The frog has a restricted range in rugged sandstone country, from Walcott Inlet to the Prince Regent National Park, where it occurs in rocky waterholes and creeks.

References

 
Litoria
Endemic fauna of Australia
Frogs of Australia
Amphibians of Western Australia
Amphibians described in 2010
Taxa named by Paul Doughty
Taxa named by Michael J. Tyler